Küçükçekmece railway station is a railway station in Küçükçekmece, Istanbul. The station was originally built in 1872 by the Oriental Railway. In 1955, the station was rebuilt as a stop on the Istanbul suburban commuter rail line until 2013, when the entire line was closed down for expansion and renovation. Küçükçekmece station was demolished as a new one was built just south of the former platform and a third track was added. The new station entered service on 12 March 2019 and became a stop on the Marmaray commuter rail line.

References

Railway stations in Istanbul Province
Railway stations opened in 1872
1872 establishments in the Ottoman Empire
Küçükçekmece
Marmaray